John Moore (26 April 1730 – 18 January 1805) was Archbishop of Canterbury in the Church of England.

Life
Moore was the son of Thomas Moore, a butcher, and his wife Elizabeth. He was born in Gloucester and was baptised at St. Michael's Church, Gloucester. He was educated at The Crypt School, Gloucester. He was a student at Pembroke College, Oxford (matriculated 1745; BA 1748; MA 1751).

After ordination, he was for some years tutor to Lord Charles Spencer and Lord Robert Spencer, the younger sons of Charles Spencer, 3rd Duke of Marlborough. On 21 September 1761, he was preferred to the fifth prebendal stall in the church of Durham and, in April 1763, to a canonry at Christ Church, Oxford. 
On 1 July 1764, he received the degrees of B.D. and D.D. On 19 September 1771, he was made Dean of Canterbury, and on 10 February 1775, Bishop of Bangor.

On the death of Archbishop Frederick Cornwallis, he was translated to the See of Canterbury on 26 April 1783, on the joint recommendation of bishops Robert Lowth and Richard Hurd, both of whom had declined the primacy.
 
Though not a great ecclesiastic, Moore was an amiable and worthy prelate, a competent administrator, and a promoter of the Sunday-school movement and of missionary enterprise. He appears to have dispensed his patronage with somewhat more than due regard to the interests of his own family.

He died at Lambeth Palace on 18 January 1805 and was buried in Lambeth parish church.

Family
Moore was married twice, first to Jane Wright (1736 – about 1765), the sister of Sir James Wright, Resident at Venice on 29 April 1763 at Walcot St. Swithin, Somerset, England; and secondly, on 23 January 1770, to Catherine Eden, daughter of Sir Robert Eden of West Auckland. He left children; one son, Roger Moore, would go on to be a Canon of Canterbury Cathedral.

More than 30 years after his first wife's death the Archbishop would officiate at the wedding of her nephew, the later Sir George Wright, 2nd Baronet, to Rebecca Maclane, on 3 June 1796.

Discovery of his coffin

In 2017, during the refurbishment of the Garden Museum, which is housed at the medieval church of St Mary-at-Lambeth, 30 lead coffins were found; one with an archbishop's red and gold mitre on top of it. A metal plate identified one of these as belonging to Moore, with another being that of his wife Catherine.

References

Attribution

Sources

1730 births
1805 deaths
18th-century Anglican archbishops
19th-century Anglican archbishops
Alumni of Pembroke College, Oxford
Archbishops of Canterbury
Bishops of Bangor
Burials at St Mary-at-Lambeth
Deans of Canterbury
People educated at The Crypt School, Gloucester
18th-century Welsh Anglican bishops